Sotteville-lès-Rouen (literally Sotteville near Rouen) is a commune and railway town in the Seine-Maritime department in the Normandy region in northern France.

Geography

Heraldry

Transportation 
The métro connects the commune with Rouen and Saint-Étienne-du-Rouvray.

The commune used to be a railway town in the days of the old Rouen tramway.

Population

Places of interest 
 The three churches of Notre-Dame, St. Vincent and Notre-Dame, all dating from the twentieth century.

People 
 René Alix (1907–1966), choral conductor and composer
 Jacques Anquetil (1934–1987), racing cyclist, started his career here with AC Sotteville.
 Anny Duperey (1947-), comedian, lives here.

See also 
 Communes of the Seine-Maritime department

References

Bibliography 
 L. Leroy, D. Andrieu et J.-F. Glabik, Sotteville, une vie, éd. Maison pour Tous, 1989 ; 1991 
 Guy Pessiot, Histoire de l'agglomération rouennaise : la rive gauche, éd. du P'tit Normand, 1990

External links 

  Official commune website

Communes of Seine-Maritime